Manfred Ebert (6 December 1935 – 24 December 2003) was a German footballer who played for 1. FC Saarbrücken, FV Speyer and the Saarland national team as a forward.

References

1935 births
2003 deaths
German footballers
Saar footballers
Saarland international footballers
1. FC Saarbrücken players
FV Speyer players
Association football forwards